The Girl from Hell is a 1923 German silent drama film directed by Frederic Zelnik and starring Lya Mara, Carl Auen and Harald Paulsen. It premiered at the Marmorhaus in Berlin.

The film's sets were designed by the art director Fritz Lederer.

Cast
 Lya Mara
 Carl Auen
 Harald Paulsen
 Emmy Wyda
 Kurt Goetze
 Harry Gondi
 Knud Horvard
 Gustav May
 Albert Patry
 Emil Stammer

References

Bibliography
 Bock, Hans-Michael & Bergfelder, Tim. The Concise CineGraph. Encyclopedia of German Cinema. Berghahn Books, 2009.

External links

1923 films
Films of the Weimar Republic
German silent feature films
Films directed by Frederic Zelnik
German black-and-white films
1920s German films